Robert Peyton (by 1523 – 1590), of Isleham, Cambridgeshire, was an English politician.

Family
Robert was the son of Robert Peyton, MP. He married Elizabeth Rich, daughter of Richard Rich, 1st Baron Rich of Rochford Hall and Leigh's Priory, Essex. Their eldest surviving son was  Sir John Peyton, 1st Baronet.

Career
He was a Member (MP) of the Parliament of England for Cambridgeshire in 1558 and 1563.

References

1590 deaths
People from Isleham
English MPs 1558
English MPs 1563–1567
Year of birth uncertain